Institute of Design and Construction (IDC), was a non-profit technical college, now defunct, located in Brooklyn, NY. It was founded in 1947 by Vito P. Battista, R.A., a first generation Italian-American architect, civic leader and member of the New York State Assembly.

IDC offered Associate degrees in Building Construction Technology and Architectural Design Technology as well as a variety of continuing and professional education courses. It was registered by the New York State Department of Education, but due to declining student enrollment and accreditation concerns by the New York State Board of Regents, IDC voluntarily ceased operations in July 2015.

References

External links
Institute of Design and Construction website

Universities and colleges in Brooklyn
Universities and colleges in New York City
Defunct private universities and colleges in New York City